Sabaa Tahir is an American young adult novelist best known for her New York Times-bestselling An Ember in the Ashes, its sequels, and the novel All My Rage.

Two of her novels, An Ember in the Ashes and A Torch Against the Night, were listed among Time Magazine's 100 Best Fantasy Books of All Time in 2020. In 2022, her novel All My Rage won the 2022 Boston Globe–Horn Book Award, the National Book Award for Young People's Literature and the Michael L. Printz Award'.

Tahir has also published non-fiction reviews and essays in The New York Times, The Washington Post  and Vox.

 Life 
Tahir grew up in the Mojave Desert in Ridgecrest, California with her parents and two older brothers. Her parents emigrated from Pakistan to the United Kingdom before moving their family to the United States. She attended UCLA, during which time she interned at The Washington Post. After graduation, she took a job there as a copy editor. She currently lives in the San Francisco Bay Area.

Bibliography

Fantasy

An Ember in the Ashes series
 An Ember in the Ashes (2015)
 A Torch Against the Night (2016)
 A Reaper at the Gates (2018)
 A Sky Beyond the Storm (2020)

Graphic novel prequel
 A Thief Among the Trees (2020)
 A Spark Within the Forge (2022)
 TBA

ContemporaryAll My Rage (2022)

Short fiction
 Reirin, From a Certain Point of View, Del Rey, (2017)
 Waiting, Three Sides of a Heart, ed. Natalie C. Parker, Harper Collins  (2017)
 News of the Day, The New York Times ed. Veronica Chambers and Jeff Giles, [The New York Times], (2019)
 Forthcoming Untitled, Magic Has No Borders'', ed. Samira Ahmed, Harper Teen (2023)

References

Living people
21st-century American novelists
American fantasy writers
American writers of Pakistani descent
Writers from the San Francisco Bay Area
Year of birth missing (living people)
American women novelists
21st-century American women writers
Novelists from California
Women science fiction and fantasy writers
American writers of young adult literature
Women writers of young adult literature
People from Ridgecrest, California
National Book Award for Young People's Literature winners